The following is a list of Virgin Galactic launches since 2003.

Virgin Galactic launchers 
The Virgin Galactic series of vehicles, starting with SpaceShipOne, are more comparable to the X-15 than orbiting spacecraft like the Space Shuttle. Accelerating a spacecraft to orbital speed requires more than 60 times as much energy as accelerating it to Mach 3. It would also require an elaborate heat shield to safely dissipate that energy during re-entry.

SpaceShipOne 

Although not a Virgin Galactic launcher, SpaceShipOne was the direct predecessor of the Virgin Galactic vehicles, and served to demonstrate the feasibiility of the concept.  SpaceShipOne was an experimental air-launched rocket-powered aircraft with sub-orbital spaceflight capability at speeds of up to 3,000 ft/s (900 m/s), using a hybrid rocket motor. The design featured a unique "feathering" atmospheric reentry system where the rear half of the wing and the twin tail booms folds 70 degrees upward along a hinge running the length of the wing; this increases drag while retaining stability. SpaceShipOne completed the first crewed private spaceflight in 2004. That same year, it won the US$10 million Ansari X Prize and was immediately retired from active service. Its mother ship was named "White Knight". Both craft were developed and flown by Mojave Aerospace Ventures, which was a joint venture between Paul Allen and Scaled Composites, Burt Rutan's aviation company. Allen provided the funding of approximately US$25 million.

Rutan has indicated that ideas about the project began as early as 1994 and the full-time development cycle time to the 2004 accomplishments was about three years. The vehicle first achieved supersonic flight on December 17, 2003, which was also the one-hundredth anniversary of the Wright Brothers' historic first powered flight. SpaceShipOne's first official spaceflight, known as flight 15P, was piloted by Mike Melvill. A few days before that flight, the Mojave Air and Space Port was the first commercial spaceport licensed in the United States. A few hours after that flight, Melvill became the first licensed U.S. commercial astronaut. The overall project name was "Tier One" which has evolved into Tier 1b with a goal of taking a successor ship's first passengers into space.

SpaceShipOne's official model designation is Scaled Composites Model 316.

SpaceShipTwo 
The Scaled Composites Model 339 SpaceShipTwo (SS2) is an air-launched suborbital spaceplane type designed for space tourism. It is manufactured by The Spaceship Company, a California-based company owned by Virgin Galactic.

SpaceShipTwo is carried to its launch altitude by a White Knight Two aircraft, before being released to fly on into the upper atmosphere powered by its rocket engine. It then glides back to Earth and performs a conventional runway landing. The spaceship was officially unveiled to the public on 7 December 2009 at the Mojave Air and Space Port in California. On 29 April 2013, after nearly three years of unpowered testing, the first one constructed successfully performed its first powered test flight.

Virgin Galactic plans to operate a fleet of five SpaceShipTwo spaceplanes in a private passenger-carrying service and has been taking bookings for some time, with a suborbital flight carrying an updated ticket price of US$250,000. The spaceplane could also be used to carry scientific payloads for NASA and other organizations.

VSS Enterprise 

VSS Enterprise (tail number: N339SS) was the first SpaceShipTwo (SS2) spaceplane, built by Scaled Composites for Virgin Galactic.  As of 2004, it was planned to be the first of five commercial suborbital SS2 spacecraft planned by Virgin Galactic.
It was also the first ship of the Scaled Composites Model 339 SpaceShipTwo class, based on upscaling the design of record-breaking SpaceShipOne.

The VSS Enterprises name was an acknowledgement of the USS Enterprise from the Star Trek television series.  The spaceplane also shared its name with NASA's prototype Space Shuttle orbiter, as well as the aircraft carrier USS Enterprise.
It was rolled out on 7 December 2009.

SpaceShipTwo made its first powered flight in April 2013. Richard Branson said it "couldn't have gone more smoothly".

On 31 October 2014, during a test flight, the first SpaceShipTwo VSS Enterprise broke up in flight and crashed in the Mojave desert. A preliminary investigation suggested that the craft's descent device deployed too early. One pilot, Michael Alsbury, was killed; the other was treated for a serious shoulder injury after parachuting from the stricken spacecraft.

 VSS Unity 

The second SpaceShipTwo spacecraft, VSS Unity, was unveiled on 19 February 2016. The spacecraft completed ground-based system integration testing in September 2016.
The vehicle is undergoing flight testing. Its first flight to space (above 50 miles altitude), VSS Unity VP03, took place on 13 December 2018.

VSS Unity (Virgin Space Ship Unity, Registration: N202VG), previously referred to as VSS Voyager, is a SpaceShipTwo-class suborbital rocket-powered crewed spaceplane.  It is the second SpaceShipTwo to be built and will be used as part of the Virgin Galactic fleet.

 SpaceShipThree SpaceShip III (SS3, also with Roman numeral III; formerly SpaceShipThree) is an upcoming class of spaceplanes by Virgin Galactic to follow SpaceShipTwo. It was first teased on the Virgin Galactic Twitter account on 25 February 2021 announcing the rollout of first plane on 30 March 2021.

 Launch Statistics 
 Rocket 

 Outcome 

 Flight type 

 Flights 
 SpaceShipOne  Flights 
On 17 December 2003—on the 100th anniversary of the Wright brothers first powered flight of an aircraft—SpaceShipOne, piloted by Brian Binnie on Flight 11P, made its first rocket-powered flight and became the first privately built craft to achieve supersonic flight.

All of the flights of SpaceShipOne were from the Mojave Airport Civilian Flight Test Center. Flights were numbered, starting with flight 01 on May 20, 2003. One or two letters are appended to the number to indicate the type of mission. An appended C indicates that the flight was a captive carry, G indicates an unpowered glide, and P''' indicates a powered flight. If the actual flight differs in category from the intended flight, two letters are appended: the first indicating the intended mission and the second the mission actually performed.

The flights were accompanied by two chase planes—an Extra 300 owned and flown by Chuck Coleman, and a Beechcraft Starship.

 SpaceShipTwo 

 VSS Enterprise flights Sources:''

Legend

Flights

VSS Unity flights

Legend

Flights

Notes

References 

Virgin Galactic
Virgin Galactic